Utikoomak Lake 155 is an Indian reserve of the Whitefish Lake First Nation in Alberta, located within Northern Sunrise County and Big Lakes County. It is 61 kilometers north of High Prairie. In the 2016 Canadian Census, it recorded a population of 723 living in 158 of its 193 total private dwellings.

References

Indian reserves in Alberta
Whitefish Lake First Nation